Sahibzada Abul Khair Muhammad Zubair is a Pakistani politician who had been a member of the National Assembly of Pakistan from 2002 to 2007.

Political career 
He was elected to the National Assembly as a candidate of Muttahida Majlis-e-Amal from Constituency NA-220 (Hyderabad-III) in 2002 Pakistani general election. He received 41,190 votes and defeated Aftab Ahmed Shaikh of Muttahida Qaumi Movement.

References 

Pakistani MNAs 2002–2007
Living people
Jamiat Ulema-e-Pakistan politicians
Year of birth missing (living people)